Augustenborg Municipality - Until 1 January 2007 Augustenborg was a municipality (Danish, kommune) in South Jutland County on the island of Als off the east coast of the Jutland Peninsula in south Denmark. The municipality covered an area of 53 km2, and had a total population of 6,577 (2005). Its latest mayor was Åse Nygaard. The site of its municipal council was the town of Augustenborg.

Augustenborg Municipality ceased to exist due to Kommunalreformen ("The Municipality Reform" of 2007). It was combined with former Broager Municipality, Gråsten Municipality, Nordborg Municipality, Sundeved Municipality, Sydals Municipality, and Sønderborg Municipality to form the new Sønderborg Municipality.  This created a municipality with an area of 499 km2 and a total population of 49,886 (2005).

References  
 Municipal statistics: NetBorger Kommunefakta, delivered from KMD aka Kommunedata (Municipal Data)

Former municipalities of Denmark
Augustenborg, Denmark